A baseband processor (also known as baseband radio processor, BP, or BBP) is a device (a chip or part of a chip) in a network interface controller that manages all the radio functions (all functions that require an antenna); however, this term is generally not used in reference to Wi-Fi and Bluetooth radios.  A baseband processor typically uses its own RAM and firmware. Baseband processors are typically fabricated using CMOS (complementary metal–oxide–semiconductor) or RF CMOS technology, and are widely used in radio-frequency (RF) and wireless communications.

Overview 
Baseband processors typically run a real-time operating system (RTOS) as their firmware, such as ENEA's OSE, Nucleus RTOS (iPhone 3G/3GS/iPad), ThreadX (iPhone 4), and VRTX.  There are more than a few significant manufacturers of baseband processors, including Broadcom, Icera, Intel Mobile Communications (former Infineon wireless division), MediaTek, Qualcomm,  Spreadtrum, and ST-Ericsson.

The rationale of separating the baseband processor from the main processor (known as the AP or application processor) is threefold:

 Radio performance
 Radio control functions (signal modulation, encoding, radio frequency shifting, etc.) are highly timing-dependent, and require a real-time operating system.
 Radio reliability
 Separating the BP into a different component ensures proper radio operation while allowing application and OS changes.
 Legal
 Some authorities (e.g. the U.S. Federal Communications Commission (FCC)) require that the entire software stack running on a device which communicates with the mobile telephony network must be certified. Separating the BP into a different component allows reusing a stack without having to recertify the full AP.

Security concerns 

Since the software which runs on baseband processors is usually proprietary, it is impossible to perform an independent code audit. By reverse engineering some of the baseband chips, researchers have found security vulnerabilities that could be used to access and modify data on the phone remotely. In March 2014, makers of the free Android derivative Replicant announced they have found a backdoor in the baseband software of Samsung Galaxy phones that allows remote access to the user data stored on the phone.

See also
 OsmocomBB a free software for baseband processors

References

Further reading 
 Baseband Processor entry at openezx.org, archived from the original on May 5, 2013
 Babin, Steve. Developing software for Symbian OS: A beginner's guide to creating Symbian OS v9 smartphone applications in C++. Symbian Press, 2007, p. 80.

Antennas (radio)
Embedded microprocessors
Radio electronics